Himmatgarh is a village in the notified area of Zirakpur in district Mohali in state of Punjab in India.

Housing colonies
Shalimar Enclave 
Vasant Vihar (Phase-I)
Krishna Enclave

References

Mohali
Villages in Sahibzada Ajit Singh Nagar district